Hard-times tokens are American large or half cent-sized copper tokens, struck from about 1833 through 1843, serving as unofficial currency. These privately made pieces, comprising merchant, political and satirical pieces, were used during a time of political and financial crisis in the United States.

Today, hard-times tokens are collectible and usually very affordable as coins or as political history.

Background

In 1832, President Andrew Jackson ran for re-election and called for the abolition of the Second Bank of the United States. While he won the election, he worked to weaken the bank before the charter expired in 1836. Without the Bank of the United States, state banks attempted to fill the paper money gap and issued a large number of bank notes, which fueled inflation. Hoping to halt the inflation and speculation in public lands, Jackson and his Treasury secretary, Levi Woodbury, issued the Specie Circular on July 11, 1836. The circular simply stated that as of August 15 1836, banks and others who received public money were required to accept only gold and silver coins in payment for public lands.

Instead of the intended results, the circular spelled the end of a time of economic prosperity. The circular set into motion a panic, and the public began hoarding specie. Without specie to pay out, banks and merchants began having financial troubles. It wasn't too long before the effects of Jackson's decision were felt across the nation as banks and businesses failed, and a depression ensued.

By this time, Jackson's vice president, Martin Van Buren, was the elected president in office. The period of economic hardship, the Panic of 1837, during Van Buren's presidency came to be known as the "Hard Times".

See also
 Exonumia
 Civil War token

References

Sources
 Stark, Jeff, "Attack on Second Bank, fiscal policies bring 'Hard Times'", Coin World, January 3, 2006

Historical currencies of the United States
Token coins
Presidency of Andrew Jackson
Presidency of Martin Van Buren